Todd Larkin Husak (born July 6, 1978) is a former American football quarterback in the National Football League. He played professionally for the Washington Redskins.

Early life
Husak was born in Long Beach, California and graduated from St. John Bosco High School in Bellflower, California.

College career
Husak played college football at Stanford and, as the starting quarterback, led the Cardinal to the Rose Bowl in 2000. It was the school's first such appearance since 1972. Husak was named First-team All-Pac-10 for the 1999 season, when he led Stanford to the Rose Bowl. He was also named co-Most Valuable Player of the 2000 Hula Bowl. Husak threw for 6,564 yards and 41 touchdowns while at Stanford, ranking him fifth all-time for both passing and touchdowns among Stanford quarterbacks.

Professional career
Husak was drafted in the sixth round of the 2000 NFL draft by the Washington Redskins, for whom he saw limited action that season. After his time with the Redskins, he spent a few years in the NFL as an offseason or practice squad member of the Denver Broncos, New York Jets, and Cleveland Browns. He also spent one season with the Berlin Thunder of NFL Europa, and led the Thunder to the league championship in World Bowl X in 2002.

Life after the NFL
Husak retired from professional football in 2004. In 2005, he served as a graduate assistant football coach at Stanford, working with tight ends.

Beginning with the 2008 college football season, Husak began serving as the color commentator for Stanford football radio broadcasts.

References

External links
 

1978 births
Living people
People from Bellflower, California
American football quarterbacks
Players of American football from Long Beach, California
Stanford Cardinal football players
Berlin Thunder players
Washington Redskins players
Stanford Cardinal football coaches
Sportspeople from Long Beach, California
Cleveland Browns players